Silas Webster Robbins (August 24, 1785 – June 19, 1871) was a justice of the Supreme Court of Kentucky.

Robbins, son of Jacob and Eunice (Webster)
Robbins, of Rocky Hill, in Wethersfield, Connecticut, was born 24 August 1785.

He graduated Yale College in 1808.  Immediately after graduation, he entered the Law School at Litchfield, under Judge Reeve, and in 1811 emigrated to Kentucky and began the practice of his profession in Winchester. In the following year he was married, in Litchfield, to Caroline, youngest daughter of the late Uriah Tracy, at the time of his death (in 1807) U. S. Senator from Connecticut.

Robbins soon became prominent in his profession, and was appointed Judge of the Supreme Court of Kentucky; as such he was conspicuous as an "Old Court Judge" in the Old Court – New Court controversy, in which the judges so named were finally successful.

Having lost his wife in 1837, Judge Robbins removed in 1838 to Springfield, Illinois, where he resumed the practice of law. In 1858, he retired from active life to his farm in the township of Springfield, about four miles from the city, where he died, 19 June 1871, aged nearly 86.

He was married twice after the death of his first wife, and left a widow. His only surviving child was a daughter.

Attribution

External links
 Litchfield Ledger

Justices of the Kentucky Supreme Court
1785 births
1871 deaths
Yale University alumni
Litchfield Law School alumni
Illinois lawyers
Kentucky lawyers
People from Rocky Hill, Connecticut
People from Wethersfield, Connecticut
19th-century American judges
19th-century American lawyers